HMS Weymouth was laid down as the East Indiaman Earl of Mansfield. The British Royal Navy purchased her on the stocks to use as a 56-gun fourth rate. She was launched in 1795 but never was commissioned in the Royal Navy. She was transferred in February 1796 to the Transportation Board as a transport. Lieutenant Robert Passmore took command in June 1796. Commander Charles Ryder succeeded Passmore in July 1798, and Commander Ambrose Crofton replaced Ryder in August 1799.

Having sailed from Portsmouth, she was wrecked on 21 January 1800 on the bar in the Tagus on the coast of Portugal as Crofton was attempting to sail her into Lisbon harbour. Her crew was saved.

Citations and references
Citations

References
 
 
 

1795 ships
Ships built in Rotherhithe
Ships of the Royal Navy
Maritime incidents in 1800
Shipwrecks of Portugal